Two-time defending champion Stéphane Houdet and his partner Nicolas Peifer defeated the other three-time defending champion Shingo Kunieda and his partner Gordon Reid in the final, 6–3, 3–6, 7–5 to win the men's doubles wheelchair tennis title at the 2016 Australian Open. With the win, Peifer completed the career Grand Slam.

Seeds

Draw

External links
 Main Draw

Wheelchair Men's Doubles
2016 Men's Doubles